Nasr ( "Vulture") was apparently a pre-Islamic Arabian deity of the Himyarites. Reliefs depicting vultures have been found in Himyar, including at Maṣna'at Māriya and Haddat Gulays, and Nasr appears in theophoric names. Nasr has been identified by some scholars with Maren-Shamash, who is often flanked by vultures in depictions at Hatra. Hisham ibn Al-Kalbi's Book of Idols describes a temple to Nasr at Balkha, an otherwise unknown location. Some sources attribute the deity to "the dhū-l-Khila tribe of Himyar". Himyaritic inscriptions were thought to describe "the vulture of the east" and "the vulture of the west", which Augustus Henry Keane interpreted as solstitial worship; however these are now thought to read "eastward" and "westward" with n-s-r as a preposition. J. Spencer Trimingham believed Nasr was "a symbol of the sun".

Classical references 

Nasr is mentioned in the Qur'an (71:23) as an idol at the time of the Noah:An Arabian vulture-god is mentioned by other ancient texts, including the Babylonian Talmud (Avodah Zarah 11b):Ḥanan b. Ḥisda says that Abba b. Aybo says, and some say it was Ḥanan b. Rava who said that Abba b. Aybo says, "There are five permanent idolatrous temples: the temple of Bel in Babylon, the temple of Nebo in Borsippa, the temple of Atargatis in Manbij, the temple of Serapis in Ashkelon, and the temple of Nishra in Arabia".And the Doctrine of Addai:Who is this Nebo, an idol made which ye worship, and Bel, which ye honor? Behold, there are those among you who adore Bath Nical, as the inhabitants of Harran your neighbours, and Atargatis, as the people of Manbij, and Nishra, as the Arabians; also the sun and the moon, as the rest of the inhabitants of Harran, who are as yourselves.A further mention is found in Jacob of Serugh's On the Fall of the Idols, wherein the Persians are said to have been led by the devil to construct and worship N-s-r.

Notes

References

Arabian gods
Vultures
Birds in mythology